Helmut Bellingrodt (born 10 July, 1949 in Barranquilla) is a Colombian Olympic sports shooter who won two Olympic silver medals. He participated in the 1972 Munich, 1976 Montreal, and 1984 Los Angeles Summer Olympic Games. He was the first Colombian athlete to win two Olympic medals, as well as the Colombian athlete with the most until  Jackeline Rentería Castillo tied with a second bronze in wrestling - 55kg at the London 2012 Summer Olympics.

His brothers Hanspeter and Horst Bellingrodt were Olympians as well.

References

1949 births
Living people
Colombian male sport shooters
Running target shooters
Shooters at the 1972 Summer Olympics
Shooters at the 1976 Summer Olympics
Shooters at the 1984 Summer Olympics
Olympic shooters of Colombia
Olympic silver medalists for Colombia
Colombian people of German descent
Sportspeople from Barranquilla
Olympic medalists in shooting
Medalists at the 1972 Summer Olympics
Medalists at the 1984 Summer Olympics
Pan American Games medalists in shooting
Pan American Games gold medalists for Colombia
Shooters at the 1983 Pan American Games
Medalists at the 1983 Pan American Games
20th-century Colombian people